The 2020–21 season is Virtus Roma's 61st in existence and the club's 2nd consecutive season in the top tier Italian basketball.

Overview 
During the summer preseason period, the team faced financial uncertainty for the coming season, but at the end, on July 31, the president Toti decided to subscribe the team to the Lega Basket Serie A. Coach Piero Bucchi was confirmed and the team built in just less than a month.

Roma started the season without having a top sponsor and the lack of it brought more financial problems to deal with before the end of the year. In the month of December, Claudio Toti started looking for new owners whom to hand over the team, but no offer was officially made. Finally the decision to withdraw from the Serie A was taken on December 9 and the announcement was first given from the Italian Basketball Federation.

Until then Virtus Roma had played 9 games with 2 wins and was placed in the 15th place of the standing, out of 16. All the games were voided and the team was fined with 600.000 euros.

Kit 
Supplier: Macron

Players

Current roster

Depth chart

Squad changes

In

|}

Out

|}

Confirmed 

|}

From youth team 

|}

Coach

Competitions

Supercup

Serie A 

This was the situation before the official ban from the competition:

See also 

 2020–21 LBA season
 2020 Italian Basketball Supercup

References 

2020–21 in Italian basketball by club